Computer console may refer to:

Computer terminal
System console, a text entry and display device for system administration messages
Video game console, a device specially made for video game play